The ST staple is a common four- or five-amino acid residue motif in proteins and polypeptides with serine or threonine as the C-terminal residue. It is characterized by a single hydrogen bond between the hydroxyl group of the serine or threonine (at residue i + 3 or i + 4) and the main chain carbonyl group of residue i. Motifs are of two types, depending whether the motif has 4 or 5 residues. Most ST staples occur in conjunction with an alpha helix, and are usually associated with a slight bend in the helix. Two websites are available for finding and examining ST staples in proteins:  Motivated Proteins and PDBeMotif.

References

Protein structural motifs
Pentapeptides